Franklin College (founded 1818) was a college in New Athens, Ohio, founded by abolitionist John Walker (1786-1845), a Presbyterian minister in Pennsylvania and Ohio. The college was called Alma college from 1818 until 1825, when the name was changed to Franklin College. Classes were suspended during the Civil War after most of the student body enlisted for military service, but the college was revived in 1867 with 40 students.  The college ceased operation in 1919, and became associated with Muskingum College until 1927. The college building houses the Franklin Museum which showcases the span of the college and its history.

Over the course of over 100 years, the college was key in the education of two governors, eight U.S. Senators, and nine U.S. Congressmen and twenty state legislators. The college also graduated Titus Basfield, an African-American student and former slave, as well as several prominent women. While at Franklin College, Basfield became close friends with classmate John Bingham, who later became primary author of the 14th Amendment to the Constitution and the longest-serving chief American diplomat in Japan, 1873–1875.

List of presidents
Rev. William McMillan, 1825–1832
Rev. Richard Campbell, 1832–1835
Rev. Johnson Welsh, 1835–1836
Rev. Dr. Joseph Smith, 1837–1838
Rev. Jacob Coon, (pro term), 1838–1839
Rev. William Burnett, 1839–1840
Rev. Edwin H. Nevin, 1840–1845
Rev. Dr. Alexander D. Clark, 1845–1861
Presidency Vacant.  Dr. William Wishart, vice-president, 1861-1867 
Rev. R. G. Campbell, 1867–1871
Dr. Andrew F. Ross, 1871-1877
Rev. Dr. George C. Vincent, 1877-1884
Dr. William Brinkerhoff, 1884-1885
Rev. Mr. Black, 1885-1886
Rev. William Asbury Williams, 1886-1901

See also
Franklin College Building No. 5
John Bingham
William McMillan (college president)

References

External links
History of the College
Franklin Museum Website

 
Defunct private universities and colleges in Ohio
Presbyterian universities and colleges in the United States
Education in Harrison County, Ohio
Educational institutions established in 1818
Educational institutions disestablished in 1919